From February 1984 through February 1996, DC Comics held the license to publish comic books based upon the Star Trek franchise, namely Star Trek: The Original Series (TOS) and Star Trek: The Next Generation (TNG).

The main DC Comics Star Trek title was published in two series, comprising 136 issues, 9 annuals, and a number of special issues. Two series were also published based upon  Star Trek: The Next Generation, plus several mini-series that linked TOS and TNG.

Publication history

Vol. 1
Volume one was published from February 1984–Nov. 1988. It featured stories set after Star Trek II: The Wrath of Khan.

In addition to the Star Trek original cast, original characters in this series included the bigoted Native American Ensign William Bearclaw, Ensign Nancy Bryce, the bird-like Dr. Chu-Sa, Lt. Commander Maria Morelli, Ensign Elizabeth Sherwood, and the Klingons Konom and Bernie. There were also appearances by Arex and M'Ress, previously seen in Star Trek: The Animated Series.

Vol. 1 Annuals

Vol. 1 Movie Adaptations

Vol. 2 
Star Trek volume 2 was published from Oct. 1989 – Feb. 1996. It featured stories set after Star Trek V: The Final Frontier.

Vol. 2 Annuals

Vol. 2 Movie Adaptation

Who's Who in Star Trek 
Inspired by a number of character profile series being published at the time by both DC and Marvel Comics, Who's Who in Star Trek was a two-issue special published in March and April 1987 that provided profiles of various characters in the Star Trek comic book universe. Artists included John Byrne and Todd McFarlane.

The Modala Imperative 
This limited series continued in a follow-up with Star Trek: The Next Generation.

Original graphic novels

Specials

Collected editions
Some of the comic books have been collected into trade paperbacks:

References

1984 comics debuts
1989 comics debuts
Comics based on television series
DC Comics titles
DC comics
Fiction set in the 23rd century
Fiction set in the 24th century